is the twelfth and last single of the Morning Musume subgroup Minimoni. It was released on April 21, 2004 and sold 34,398 copies. It peaked at number six on the Oricon Charts.  Its title track was used as the theme song to the miniseries Minimoni de Bremen Ongakutai.

Track listing 
All songs written and composed by Tsunku.
 
 
 "Lucky Cha Cha Cha! (Instrumental)"

Members at the time of single 
 Mika Todd (ミカ)
 Nozomi Tsuji (辻希美)
 Ai Kago (加護亜依)
 Ai Takahashi (高橋愛)

External links 
 Lucky Cha Cha Cha! entry on the Hello! Project official website

Zetima Records singles
Minimoni songs
2004 singles
Songs written by Tsunku
Song recordings produced by Tsunku
Japanese-language songs
2004 songs